The 1986 Australian Swimming Championships were held at the Adelaide Aquatic Centre in Adelaide, South Australia from 27 February to 2 March. They were organised by Australian Swimming.

Medal winners

Men's events 

Legend: AR – Australian record; ACR – Australian All Comers record

Women's events 

Legend: AR – Australian record; ACR – Australian All Comers record

Australian Swimming Championships
Australian Swimming Championships, 1986
Sport in Adelaide
Swim